Massingham  may refer to any of the following in  North Norfolk:

Great Massingham,
the former RAF Great Massingham
Little Massingham
Massingham railway station (closed in 1959).